Pabstia is a genus of flowering plants from the orchid family, Orchidaceae. It has 5 known species, all endemic to Brazil.

Pabstia jugosa (Lindl.) Garay 
Pabstia modestior (Rchb.f.) Garay
Pabstia placanthera (Hook.) Garay
Pabstia schunkiana V.P.Castro
Pabstia viridis (Lindl.) Garay

See also 
 List of Orchidaceae genera

References 

 Berg Pana, H. 2005. Handbuch der Orchideen-Namen. Dictionary of Orchid Names. Dizionario dei nomi delle orchidee. Ulmer, Stuttgart

External links 

Orchids of Brazil
Zygopetalinae genera
Zygopetalinae